Acrolophus laticapitana is a moth of the family Acrolophidae. It was described by Walsingham in 1884. It is found in North America, northern California to southern Arizona.

The length of the forewings 6.5–9.5 mm.

Subspecies
Acrolophus laticapitana laticapitana
Acrolophus laticapitana unistriganus Dyar, 1903

References

Moths described in 1884
laticapitana